Darina Mifkova (born May 24, 1974 in Prague) is an Italian former volleyball player.

She was born in Prague, then part of  Czechoslovakia, but grew up in Bergamo and later represented Italy at international level. She won the gold medal at the 2002 World Championship, held in Germany.

References
 Profile
 LegaVolley

1974 births
Living people
Sportspeople from Prague
Sportspeople from Bergamo 
Czech women's volleyball players
Italian women's volleyball players
Volleyball players at the 2000 Summer Olympics
Olympic volleyball players of Italy
Italian people of Czech descent